Plaine-d'Argenson is a commune in the department of Deux-Sèvres, western France. The municipality was established on 1 January 2018 by merger of the former communes of Prissé-la-Charrière (the seat), Belleville, Boisserolles and Saint-Étienne-la-Cigogne.

See also 
Communes of the Deux-Sèvres department

References 

Communes of Deux-Sèvres
Populated places established in 2018
2018 establishments in France